The 2014 KML Playoffs was the final phase of the 2013–14 KML season. The playoffs began on 16 April and ended on 21 May. The tournament concluded with Kalev/Cramo defeating TÜ/Rock 4 games to 0 in the finals. Vlad Moldoveanu was named KML Finals MVP.

Bracket

Quarter-finals
The quarter-finals are best-of-5 series.

TÜ/Rock vs. Valga/Maks & Moorits

Kalev/Cramo vs. TYCO Rapla

Rakvere Tarvas vs. Pärnu

TTÜ vs. Tallinna Kalev

Semi-finals
The semi-finals are best-of-5 series.

TÜ/Rock vs. Tallinna Kalev

Kalev/Cramo vs. Rakvere Tarvas

Third place
The finals are best-of-3 series.

Rakvere Tarvas vs. Tallinna Kalev

Finals
The finals are best-of-7 series.

TÜ/Rock vs. Kalev/Cramo

References

External links
 Official Site 

Korvpalli Meistriliiga playoffs
playoffs